Garden Party is Rick Nelson & the Stone Canyon Band's country rock album from 1972. The title song tells the story of Nelson being booed at a concert at Madison Square Garden.

Track listing
All tracks composed by Rick Nelson; except where indicated.
"Let It Bring You Along"  (Stephen A. Love) – 4:12
"Garden Party" – 3:45
"So Long Mama" – 3:25
"I Wanna Be With You"  (Randy Meisner, Allen Kemp) – 2:15
"Are You Really Real?" – 3:25
"I'm Talking About You"  (Chuck Berry) – 3:55
"Night Time Lady" – 3:50
"A Flower Opens Gently By" – 3:08
"Don't Let Your Goodbye Stand"  (Richard Stekol) – 3:17
"Palace Guard" – 5:10

Charts

Personnel
Rick Nelson – guitar, lead vocals
Allen Kemp – lead guitar, background vocals
Tom Brumley – steel guitar
Stephen A. Love – bass, background vocals
Patrick Shanahan – drums
Don Nelson – wood flute

Production
Producer: Rick Nelson
Recording engineer: Michael "Nemo" Shields
Photography: Martin S. Martin
Artistic design: Kristen Nelson

References

Ricky Nelson albums
1972 albums
Decca Records albums
Country rock albums